Nellore Chodas (also known as Nellore Cholas) were one of the Telugu Chola families who ruled over parts of Andhra Pradesh in the 11th and 12th centuries. They were chieftains to Kakatiyas and Kalyani Chalukyas and ruled over the Nellore region.

History
These Chodas claimed their descent from the famous Karikala Chola. They ruled over their kingdom consisting of the Nellore, Cuddapah, Chittoor and Chengalput districts with Vikramasimhapuri (modern Nellore) as their capital.

Chola Bijjana was the first important chief in the Nellore Choda clan. As a feudatory of Someswara I of Western Chalukyas, he took part in the wars of the Chalukyas and Later Cholas. In recognition of the loyalty and services of his descendants to the Chalukyas of Kalyani, Vikramadiya II appointed them as rulers of Pakanadu.

Later Tikka (1223–1248), the father of the famous Manumasiddhi, extended his kingdom to as far south as the river Kaveri. He owed nominal allegiance to the already crippled Later Cholas. Along with the Hoysala Vira Narasimha, he helped the Later Cholas ruler Rajaraja Chola III in restoring him back to his throne by repulsing the attacks of Aniyanka Bhima, Kopperunchinga II and the Pandyas.

Subsequently, when the Hoyasala Vira Narasimha's successor Somesvara, desirous of making the Later Chola ruler a puppet in his hands, joined hands with the Pandyas and attacked Rajendra III, Choda Tikka came to the rescue of the Chola emperor. He defeated both the Hoyasala and the Pandyan forces and got thereby the Tondaimandalam region for himself. He even assumed the title Cholasthapanacharya. During the reign of Tikka's son and successor Manumasiddhi II (1248–1263), the power of the Nellore Cholas was at its low ebb.

About the year 1260, a dangerous feud broke out  between Manumasiddhi and Katamaraju, the chief of Erragaddapadu in Kanigiri region. The feud was on the issue of the rights of the two princes to use certain wide meadows as grazing grounds for their flocks of cattle. It led to the fierce engagement of the two sides and the bloody battle was fought at Panchalingala on the Paleru river. Manumasiddhi's forces led by Khadga Tikkana, the cousin of poet Tikkana won the battle, but the leader perished. This feud and the consequent battle formed the theme of the popular ballad entitled "Katamaraju Katha". Shortly after this disastrous battle, Manumasiddhi died.

With the death of Manumasiddhi II, the Nellore kingdom lost its individuality, became a battle ground between the Kakatiyas and the Pandyas and changed hands frequently. In the reign of Kakatiya Prataparudra II, the Nellore region became  part and parcel of the Kakatiya empire and lost its political significance.

Religion
The region during this period witnessed both Saivism and Vaishnavism.

Literature

The period of rule of the Telugu Chodas was in particular significant for the development it received in the Telugu literature under the patronage of the rulers. It was the age in which the great Telugu poets Tikkana, Ketana and Marana enriched the literature with their remarkable contributions. Tikkana Somayaji was a minister of Manumasiddhi II of Nellore.  This great poet had for his credit two important works in Telugu. The first one is Nirvachanottara Ramayanamu. Though a highly Sanskritised style was employed, it is characterised by excellent literary qualities and abounding elements of Pathos and heroism. However it is the Andhra Mahabharata which brought for Tikkana undying fame and made him one of the immortals. Though it is a translation of the last fifteen volumes of the Mahabharata, left out by his predecessor Nannaya, yet Tikkana put life and blood into it with an avowed objective of making it an epic. His delineation of character, dramatic dialogue and lucid and at the same time suggestive exposition of facts are masterly in nature. His broad spiritual outlook, lofty idealism, high imagination and splendid diction made him Kavi Brahma (The Supreme Creator among poets).

See also
Epic of Katamaraju

References
 Durga Prasad, History of the Andhras up to 1565 A. D., P. G. PUBLISHERS, GUNTUR (1988)
 South Indian Inscriptions - http://www.whatisindia.com/inscriptions/

Dynasties of India
Empires and kingdoms of India
Chola dynasty
History of Andhra Pradesh